The New Zealand national cricket team toured Pakistan and Sri Lanka in November and December 1984 to play a three-match Test series against the Pakistani national cricket team. The second Test match of the series was the 1,000th Test to be played. Pakistan won the Test series 2–0. New Zealand were captained by Jeremy Coney and Pakistan by Zaheer Abbas. In addition, New Zealand played two Limited Overs Internationals (LOI) against the Sri Lankan national cricket team and four against Pakistan.

One Day Internationals vs Sri Lanka

The series between New Zealand and Sri Lanka was drawn 1-1.

1st ODI

2nd ODI

One Day Internationals vs Pakistan

Pakistan won the Wills Series 3-1.

1st ODI

2nd ODI

3rd ODI

4th ODI

Test series summary

First Test

Second Test

Third Test

References

External links

1984 in New Zealand cricket
1984 in Pakistani cricket
1984 in Sri Lankan cricket
1984
1984
International cricket competitions from 1980–81 to 1985
Pakistani cricket seasons from 1970–71 to 1999–2000
Sri Lankan cricket seasons from 1972–73 to 1999–2000